Robert Stoddart (born 16 February 1950) is a Canadian former swimmer. He competed in two events at the 1972 Summer Olympics.

References

External links
 

1950 births
Living people
Canadian male swimmers
Olympic swimmers of Canada
Swimmers at the 1972 Summer Olympics
Sportspeople from St. Catharines
Swimmers at the 1967 Pan American Games
Pan American Games competitors for Canada